Arif Lohar (born 18 April 1966) is a Pakistani Punjabi folk singer. He became popular in Pakistan as well as in India after his  famous song "Jugni" with Nooran Lal in 2006. He usually sings accompanied by a native musical instrument resembling tongs (called a ‘Chimta’).  His folk music is representative of the traditional folk heritage of the Punjab.  He is the son of the renowned folk singer Alam Lohar.

Early life
Arif Lohar was born in 1966 in Lalamusa , Punjab, Pakistan. His father was Alam Lohar, who belonged to the village of Achh in Lalamusa nearby Gujrat Tehsil, and was a prominent folk singer.

Career
Arif Lohar has performed in more than 50 foreign tours around the world during the last 20 years, including tours to the UK, United States and UAE. In 2004, he performed in China for the opening of the Asian Games, which had a crowd of close to 1 million. He once performed in North Korea for the late General Secretary Kim Jong-il as part of an international delegation of peace and goodwill. He has also played multiple lead roles in Punjabi movies, and produced three songs for the soundtrack of Syed Noor's film Jugni (2012), the highest-grossing Pakistani film of 2012.

In 2005, Arif Lohar was awarded the Pride of Performance Award by the Government of Pakistan. To date, he has more than 150 albums (including many Singles – LP's) to his credit and recorded more than 3,000 songs, mostly in the Punjabi language.

In 2006, he made headlines in the Punjabi music world by releasing his album "21st Century Jugni", with music produced, arranged, and mastered by Mukhtar Sahota in Wolverhampton, UK, which was released by Internalmusic UK.
 
In June 2010, Arif Lohar participated in Coke-Studio (a Pakistani live session programme by Rohail Hayat). During Coke-Studio season 3, Arif Lohar performed "Alif Allah (Jugni)" with upcoming musician Meesha Shafi.
Lohar's performance for Coke Studio featured two other songs: "Mirza" and "Alif Allah Chambey Dey Booti/Jugni", the latter a collaboration that became an international success. Filmmaker Saif Ali Khan bought the rights to "Jugni" for use as a feature song in his Bollywood movie Cocktail. Other versions of "Jugni" have also been featured in Bollywood movies, including an adapted version that first appeared on "21st Century Jugni" album in the film Diary of a Butterfly.  He also sang in the Bollywood film Bhaag Milkha Bhaag (2013). 

He has also sung in multiple Punjabi Films in Pakistan and India.

Lohar's Charity

In 2004, Arif's eldest brother, Dr Arshad Mahmood Lohar, formed Alam Lohar Memorial Trust (ALMT) in honour of their father. 

An affiliate of the trust was a production studio which was created to design and raise awareness for health campaigns in the UK, including the Stop Smoking, and Healthy Mothers and Healthy Babies campaigns on behalf of the National Health Service. These campaigns targeted mainly Pakistani and other South Asian communities with health problems, and Arif performed concerts around the UK to promote it.

In September 2010, Arif Lohar began actively campaigning to help victims of the 2010 Pakistan floods. He appeared on national television to help encourage local and international fundraising, and also performed at special concerts throughout Pakistan.

Discography 
 Alif Allah (Jugni)
 Ek Pal
 Bol Mitti Diya Baawiya
 Sher Punjab Da
 Soniye
 Aakhian
 Bhaag Milkha Bhaag (2013)
 Punjab Bolda
 Paar Langadey Veh
 Yaara Kaulu Yaar Gwanchan
 Koka Saat Rang Dah
 Sianyah
 Ik Din Pyaar Da
 Mirza
 Jugni
 Panj Dariyah
 The Legend
 Kamlee Yaar dee Kamlee
 21st Century Jugni (Mukhtar Sahota)

Awards and recognition
 Pride of Performance Award by the President of Pakistan in 2005
 Lifetime Achievement Award at Brit Asia TV Music Awards 2018

See also
 Shaukat Ali
 Sanam Marvi
 Saieen Zahoor
 Music of Pakistan
 List of Pakistani folk singers

References

1966 births
Living people
Pakistani folk singers
Performers of Sufi music
People from Gujrat District
Recipients of the Pride of Performance
Punjabi people
Punjabi-language singers
Pakistani playback singers
Coke Studio (Pakistani TV program)
Punjabi culture
20th-century Pakistani male singers
21st-century Pakistani male singers